The 1987 UCLA Bruins softball team represented the University of California, Los Angeles in the 1987 NCAA Division I softball season.  The Bruins were coached by Sharron Backus, who led her thirteenth season.  The Bruins played their home games at Sunset Field and finished with a record of 50–10.  They competed in the Pacific-10 Conference, where they finished second with a 7–3 record.

The Bruins were invited to the 1987 NCAA Division I softball tournament, where they swept the Northwest Regional and then completed a run to the title game of the Women's College World Series where they fell to champion Texas A&M.

Personnel

Roster

Coaches

Schedule

References

UCLA
UCLA Bruins softball seasons
1987 in sports in California
Women's College World Series seasons